The Upper Cumberland Presbyterian Church is a Christian denomination in the United States with fewer than 1,000 members among twelve congregations in Alabama and Tennessee.

Origins
The name Cumberland comes from the church's historic connection with the Cumberland Presbyterian denomination. The Upper Cumberland Presbyterian Church uses a slightly revised version of the 1883 Confession of Faith of the Cumberland Presbyterian Church (CPC); the main body of the CPC adopted a new Confession Of Faith in 1984. The seeds of the Upper Cumberland Presbyterian Church arose from a group known as the Fellowship of Cumberland Presbyterian Conservatives. Members of this group protested modernizing trends within that denomination, in particular the widespread usage of the Revised Standard Version of the Bible.

The Fellowship of Cumberland Presbyterian Conservatives formed a conference and planned a second one in Memphis, Tennessee.  When the CP General Assembly declared its actions to be unconstitutional, several leaders of the group left the CPC and formed the new Upper Cumberland Presbyterian Church.

The Upper Cumberland part of the name refers to the fact that the denomination was established in Gallatin, Tennessee, on the Upper Cumberland River, the section of the Cumberland River east of Nashville, Tennessee.

The King James Version is the official Bible of the denomination.

Distribution
The Upper Cumberland Presbyterian congregations are mostly rural, country churches. They are located in three geographic areas: East of Nashville, South of Nashville and North Central Alabama.

Governance
The representatives of the twelve congregations meet twice a year to form a presbytery. This is the highest church court of the denomination. There are no synods or general assemblies as in other Presbyterian bodies. A moderator of presbytery is elected for a six-month term. The denomination's official publication is called The Bulletin.

Training of ministers
The denomination does not have a college or seminary. Ministers are usually self-taught men who are then further trained by the Ministerial Training Committee. Some prominent ministers of the denomination have held other careers while serving as pastors.

Presbyterianism in Alabama
Presbyterianism in Tennessee
Cumberland Presbyterian Church